David Treacy (born 21 November 1989) is an Irish hurler who plays as a right wing-forward for the Dublin senior team.

Born in Glenageary, Treacy first played competitive hurling with the amalgamated Dublin Colleges team, winning an All-Ireland medal in 2006. He simultaneously came to prominence at juvenile and underage levels with the Cuala club, winning under-21 championship medals as a dual player. Treacy subsequently joined the Cuala senior team and has enjoyed much success, culminating with the winning of an All-Ireland medal in 2017. He has also won two Leinster medals and three county championship medals.

Treacy made his debut on the inter-county scene at the age of sixteen when he was selected for the Dublin minor teams in both codes. He enjoyed two championship seasons with the minor teams, Leinster medals as both a Gaelic footballer and as a hurler. He subsequently joined the Dublin under-21 hurling team, winning a Leinster medal in 2010. Treacy made his senior debut during the 2009 league and has been a regular member of the starting fifteen since then. He has won Leinster and National League medals.

Career statistics

Club

Inter-county

Personal life
Treacy is in a relationship with Sinéad Goldrick, the Dublin senior ladies' footballer.

Honours
Dublin Colleges
Dr. Croke Cup (1): 2006

Cuala
All-Ireland Senior Club Hurling Championship (2): 2017, 2018
Leinster Senior Club Hurling Championship (2): 2016, 2017,2018
Dublin Senior Hurling Championship (3): 2015, 2016, 2017

Dublin
Leinster Senior Hurling Championship (1): 2013
National Hurling League (1): 2011
Leinster Under-21 Hurling Championship (1): 2010
Leinster Minor Hurling Championship (1): 2007
Leinster Minor Football Championship (1): 2006

References

1989 births
Living people
Cuala hurlers
Dublin inter-county hurlers
People from Glenageary
Sportspeople from Dún Laoghaire–Rathdown